George Edward O'Grady (June 8, 1891 – July 25, 1974) was a Canadian professional ice hockey player who played  for the Montreal Wanderers in both the National Hockey Association and National Hockey League between 1913–1918. He was born in Montreal, Quebec.

Playing career
O'Grady played three seasons as a substitute for the Montreal Wanderers in the now-defunct NHA from 1913–14 to 1915–16. He would follow the team to the upstart National Hockey League for the start of the inaugural season in 1917–18. O'Grady appeared in four National Hockey League games for the Wanderers, as the team's rink, the Westmount Arena, burnt down in January 1918, forcing the Wanderers to fold midway through the season. During his time with the Wanderers, he wore number nine.

Career statistics

Regular season and playoffs

References

Notes

External links
 

1891 births
1974 deaths
Anglophone Quebec people
Canadian ice hockey defencemen
Ice hockey people from Montreal
Montreal Wanderers (NHA) players
Montreal Wanderers (NHL) players
Montreal Wanderers players